was a Japanese daimyō and a brother of Oda Nobunaga who lived from the late Sengoku period through the early Edo period. Nagamasu  converted to  Christianity in 1588 and took the baptismal name of John.

Biography

His childhood name was Gengorō (源五郎) and he was the 11th son of Oda Nobuhide. In 1574, he received the Chita District in Owari and the construction of Ōkusa Castle. Later, he was commissioned to serve Oda Nobutada in the Siege of Iwamura (1575), Siege of Shigisan (1577), Siege of Itami (1579) and also Siege of Takato (1582).

Nagamasu was an accomplished practitioner of the Japanese tea ceremony, which he studied under the master, Sen no Rikyū. He eventually started his own school of the tea ceremony.

In June 1582, during the incident at Honnō-ji, he was one of the vassals of Nobutada in Nijō Castle, he was able to survive and fled to Gifu Castle. 

In 1584, he then joined Oda Nobukatsu and collaborated with Tokugawa Ieyasu against Hideyoshi at the Komaki - Nagakute campaign and battled against Takigawa Kazumasu at the Siege of Kanie Castle. Later, he was one of the peacemakers between Tokugawa Ieyasu and Toyotomi Hideyoshi, also between Sassa Narimasa and Maeda Toshiie.

In 1600, he sided with Tokugawa Ieyasu and fought at the Battle of Sekigahara. He brought 450 soldiers to join Ieyasu and confronted Gamō Yorisato (Satoie).

In 1615, Nagamasu divided his fief between his sons Oda Nagamasa and Oda Hisanaga. Nagamasa founded the Kaijū-Shibamura Domain, while Hisanaga became lord of the Yanagimoto Domain.

Family
Father: Oda Nobuhide (1510–1551)
Mother: Dota Gozen
Brothers:
Oda Nobuhiro (died 1574)
Oda Nobunaga (1534–1582)
Oda Nobuyuki (1536–1557)
Oda Nobukane (1548–1614)
Oda Nobuharu (1549–1570)
Oda Nobutoki (died 1556)
Oda Nobuoki  
Oda Hidetaka (died 1555)
Oda Hidenari
Oda Nobuteru
Oda Nagatoshi
Sisters:
Oichi (1547–1583)
Oinu
Son: 
Oda Nagamasa (1587–1670)
Oda Hisanaga

References 

1548 births
1622 deaths
Converts to Roman Catholicism
Japanese artists
Japanese Roman Catholics
Oda clan
Japanese tea masters
Daimyo